The Southern California Marine Institute (SCMI) is a multi-campus research facility and non-profit oceanographic institution headquartered in Terminal Island, California.

History
In the late 1960s, marine scientists working at six campuses of the CSU system in the Los Angeles basin (Dominguez Hills, Fullerton, Long Beach, Los Angeles, Northridge, and Cal Poly Pomona) proposed the formation of an institute that would provide the advancement of marine programs. It was until 1971, when the university system decided to purchase the naval vessel R/V Nautilus for that specific purpose. In 1972, the creation of the Southern California Ocean Studies Consortium (SCOSC) was approved by the Trustees and the Presidents of the founding campuses and the operation of the R/V Nautilus floating marine laboratory began.

The University of California Los Angeles is in partnership with the Institute, thereby increasing marine research in Los Angeles, and providing educational opportunities for its students.

Membership
The eleven institutions in the Southern California Marine Institute consortium are:
 Cal Poly Pomona
 Cal State Fullerton
 Cal State Long Beach
 Cal State Northridge
 CSU Dominguez Hills
 CSU Los Angeles
 CSU San Bernardino
 CSU San Marcos
 Occidental College
 UCLA
 USC - (USC Wrigley Institute for Environmental Studies)

Research vessels
SCMI operates a fleet of two research vessels, the 76-foot R/V Yellowfin and the 64-foot R/V Sea Watch.

See also
 California State University
 Moss Landing Marine Laboratories
 Marine Mammal Center
 Alliance for Coastal Technologies

References

External links
 SCMI Official Website

 

Oceanographic organizations
Research institutes in California
Biological research institutes in the United States
Education in Los Angeles County, California
Laboratories in California
Science and technology in Greater Los Angeles
Terminal Island
California State University
California State Polytechnic University, Pomona
California State University, Dominguez Hills
California State University, Fullerton
California State University, Long Beach
California State University, Los Angeles
California State University, Northridge
California State University, San Bernardino
Institutes of the University of Southern California
Occidental College
Research at Cal Poly Pomona
Research institutes established in 1993
1993 establishments in California